Rockland is an unincorporated community in Warren County, in the U.S. state of Kentucky.

History
A post office called Rockland was established in 1875, and remained in operation until 1916. The community was named for a rock outcropping near the original town site.

References

Unincorporated communities in Warren County, Kentucky
Unincorporated communities in Kentucky